"I Can't Wait Another Minute" is the title of a number-one R&B single by Hi-Five. The song spent one week at number one on the US R&B chart, and peaked at number eight on the US Pop chart. Also the song featured original member Toriano Easley before he left the group. I Can't Wait Another Minute was written and produced by songwriter Eric Foster White.

Charts

See also
List of number-one R&B singles of 1991 (U.S.)

References

1990 songs
1991 singles
Jive Records singles
Songs written by Eric Foster White
Hi-Five songs
Song recordings produced by Eric Foster White